Ashoona is a surname commonly found in Inuit culture.

People with this surname include:
 Kiugak Ashoona (1933–2014), Canadian Inuk sculptor
 Mayureak Ashoona (born 1946), Canadian Inuk artist
 Napachie Ashoona (1938–2002), commonly known by married name Napachie Pootoogook, Canadian Inuk graphic artist
 Pitseolak Ashoona (1904–1983), Canadian Inuk sculptor
 Shuvinai Ashoona (born 1961), Canadian Inuk artist

Lists of people by surname